is a Japanese industrial and fashion designer. He designs such things as spectacle frames and chronographs in addition to clothing.

In 2004, he bowed out from designing his own self-named brand, entrusting creative direction to Taishi Nobukuni, a graduate of London's St. Martin's College.  The rejuvenated label has regained some of its former glory with a funky mix of 1970s vintage looks and contemporary street styling a huge commercial and critical success.

References

External links 
 

Japanese industrial designers
Japanese fashion designers
Living people
Clothing brands
Japanese brands
Year of birth missing (living people)